The Saur Revolution or Sowr Revolution, also known as the April Revolution or the April Coup, was staged on 27–28 April 1978 by the People's Democratic Party of Afghanistan (PDPA) and overthrew Afghan president Mohammed Daoud Khan, who had himself taken power in the 1973 Afghan coup d'état and established an autocratic one-party system in the country. Daoud and most of his family were executed at the Arg in the capital city of Kabul by PDPA-affiliated military officers, after which his supporters were also purged and killed.

The uprising was ordered by PDPA member Hafizullah Amin, who would become a significant figure in the revolutionary Afghan government. At a press conference in New York in June 1978, Amin claimed that the event was not a coup d'état, but rather a "popular revolution" carried out by the "will of the people" against Daoud's government. The Saur Revolution involved heavy fighting throughout Afghanistan and resulted in the deaths of as many as 2,000 military personnel and civilians combined; it remains a significant event in Afghanistan's history as it marked the beginning of decades of continuous conflict in the country.

Background
With the support and assistance of minority political party the People's Democratic Party of Afghanistan (PDPA), Mohammed Daoud Khan had taken power in the 1973 Afghan coup d'état by overthrowing the monarchy ruled by his first cousin, King Mohammed Zahir Shah, and had established the first Republic of Afghanistan.

President Daoud was convinced that closer ties and military support from the Soviet Union would allow Afghanistan to take control of Pashtun lands in northwest Pakistan. However, Daoud, who was ostensibly committed to a policy of non-alignment, became uneasy over Soviet attempts to dictate Afghanistan's foreign policy, and relations between the two countries deteriorated.

Under the secular government of Daoud, factionalism and rivalry developed in the PDPA, with two main factions being the Parcham and Khalq factions. On 17 April 1978, a prominent member of the Parcham, Mir Akbar Khyber, was murdered. Although the government issued a statement deploring the assassination, Nur Mohammad Taraki of the PDPA charged that the government was responsible, a belief that was shared by much of the Kabul intelligentsia. PDPA leaders apparently feared that Daoud was planning to eliminate them.

During the funeral ceremonies for Khyber a protest against the government occurred, and shortly thereafter most of the leaders of PDPA, including Babrak Karmal, were arrested. Hafizullah Amin was put under house arrest, which gave him a chance to order an uprising, one that had been slowly coalescing for more than two years. Amin, without having the authority, instructed the Khalqist army officers to overthrow the government.

The revolution

Preliminary steps for the coup came in April, when a tank commander under Daoud warned of intelligence suggesting an attack on Kabul in the near future, specifically April 27. On the commander's recommendation, tanks were positioned around the Arg, the national palace. On the 27th, the tanks turned their guns on the palace. The tank commander who made the request had, in secret, defected to the Khalq beforehand.

According to an eyewitness, the first signs of the impending coup in Kabul, at about noon on 27 April, were reports of a tank column headed toward the city, smoke of unknown origin near the Ministry of Defense, and armed men, some in military uniform, guarding Ariana Circle, a major intersection. The first shots heard were near the Ministry of Interior in the downtown Shahr-e Naw section of Kabul, where a company of policemen apparently confronted an advancing tank column. From there the fighting spread to other areas of the city. Later that afternoon, the first fighter planes, Sukhoi Su-7s, came in low and fired rockets at the national palace in the center of the city. In early evening, an announcement was broadcast on government-owned Radio Afghanistan that the Khalq were overthrowing the Daoud government. The use of the word Khalq, and its traditional association with the communists in Afghanistan, made clear that the PDPA was leading the coup, and also that the rebels had captured the radio station.

The aerial attacks on the palace intensified about midnight as six Su-7s made repeated rocket attacks, lighting up the city. The next morning, 28 April, Kabul was mostly quiet, although the sound of gunfire could still be heard on the southern side of the city. As the people of Kabul ventured out of their homes they realized that the rebels were in complete control of the city and learned that President Daoud Khan and his brother Naim had been killed early that morning. A group of soldiers had surrounded the heavily-damaged palace and demanded their surrender. Instead, Daoud and Naim, pistols in hand, charged out of the palace at the soldiers, and were shot and killed. In addition, the Defense Minister of Daoud's cabinet Ghulam Haidar Rasuli, Interior Minister Abdul Qadir Nuristani, and Vice President Sayyid Abdullah were also killed.

The coup marked the end of power of the Barakzai dynasty after 152 years.

International reaction
In a May 28, 1978, cable from the United States embassy in Kabul to the US embassies in Islamabad, Moscow, New Delhi and Tehran, the US Liaison Office in Beijing, and the Secretary of State, the US ambassador in Kabul Theodore L. Eliot quotes the Chinese ambassador in Kabul Huang Mingda's characterization of the new regime as "undeniably controlled by pro-soviet communists," and him stating that chairman Taraki and Hafizullah Amin had expressed intentions to be nonaligned.  Huang Ming-Ta also observed that the Soviet Union had great influence in Afghanistan, and would provide any assistance it might need, but speculated that the Soviet Union might find it an expensive venture. Huang Ming-Ta expressed "that there might be some changes in Afghanistan within the next years, and that American programs should continue in Afghanistan". State Department analysts told U.S. President Jimmy Carter that direct Soviet involvement in the coup was unlikely: "Although they had probably become somewhat disillusioned with President Daoud, we do not think they would have tried to take over this important non-aligned country."

Alleged Soviet involvement
There was speculation that the Soviet Union was behind the coup, but no convincing evidence to support this ever appeared. Soviet military advisors in Kabul had been informed about the coup several hours before it began, but according to the current state of knowledge (as of 2021) they were not involved in the planning and the Soviet leadership was finally surprised by the events. According to Deputy Foreign Minister Georgy Korniyenko, the Soviet leadership was informed about the coup through a statement by the Reuters news agency. The Soviet news agency TASS used the term "military coup" in its report, which would most likely have been called a "popular revolution" if the Soviets stood behind the coup. Political scientist William Maley has noted that while the Soviets were not directly involved, rising tensions with Daoud may have prompted them to refrain from taking steps to prevent an Afghan communist coup.

Government after the revolution

The revolution was initially welcomed by many people in Kabul, who were dissatisfied with the Daoud government. Before the civilian government was established, Afghan National Army Air Corps colonel Abdul Qadir and the PDPA Revolutionary Council led the country for three days from 27 April 1978. Eventually a civilian government under the leadership of Nur Muhammad Taraki of the Khalq faction was formed. In Kabul, the initial cabinet appeared to be carefully constructed to alternate ranking positions between Khalqists and Parchamites. Taraki (a Khalqist) was Prime Minister, Karmal (a Parchamite) was senior Deputy Prime Minister, and Hafizullah Amin (a Khalqist) was foreign minister. The unity between Khalq and Parcham was only brief: Amin and General Mohammad Aslam Watanjar conveyed in a meeting that the revolution was the work of Khalq and that Parcham had no part of it. Taraki and Amin in early July relieved most of the Parchamites from their government positions. Karmal was sent abroad as Ambassador to Czechoslovakia. In August 1978, Taraki and Amin claimed to have uncovered a plot and executed or imprisoned several cabinet members, even imprisoning General Abdul Qadir, the military leader of the Saur Revolution until the Soviet invasion and subsequent change in leadership in late 1979. In September 1979, it was Taraki's turn to become a victim of the Revolution, as Amin overthrew and executed him.

The government once in power, as the PDPA had said before, publicly denied that it was communist.

However, in private conversations, Taraki told the Soviet ambassador Alexander Puzanov that Afghanistan would follow Marxism–Leninism. The Soviet Union was the PDPA’s model for modernizing Afghanistan and Taraki and Karmal were Soviet agents since the 1950s. The PDPA’s party constitution leaked in 1978 explicitly mentioned Marxism-Leninism as the future of Afghanistan and by the end of 1978, Amin declared the Saur revolution as the "continuation of [the] Great October Revolution", leaving no doubts about the PDPA’s orientation.

At first the new government had a moderate approach and reforms were not strongly felt; however from late October the PDPA launched drastic reforms that struck the socioeconomic tribal structure of rural Afghanistan. In a "disastrous symbolic move", it changed the national flag from the traditional black, red and Islamic green color to a near-copy of the red flag of the Soviet Union, a provocative affront to the people of the conservative country. It prohibited usury, without having in place any alternative for peasants who relied on the traditional, if exploitative, credit system in the countryside. That led to an agricultural crisis and a fall in agricultural production. Such reforms were abruptly introduced and enforced, without preliminary pilots. Land reform was criticized by one journalist as "confiscating land in a haphazard manner that enraged everyone, benefited no one, and reduced food production," and the "first instance of organized, nationwide repression in Afghanistan's modern history."

The PDPA, an advocate of equal rights for women, declared the equality of the sexes. The PDPA made a number of statements on women's rights, declaring equality of the sexes and introduced women to political life. A prominent example was Anahita Ratebzad, who was a major Marxist-Leninist leader and a member of the Revolutionary Council. Ratebzad wrote the famous May 28, 1978 New Kabul Times editorial, which declared: "Privileges which women, by right, must have are equal education, job security, health services, and free time to rear a healthy generation for building the future of the country ... Educating and enlightening women is now the subject of close government attention." Women were already guaranteed freedoms under the 1964 Constitution, but the PDPA went further by declaring full equality.

Oppression of anti-revolutionaries
The revolution also introduced severe repression of a kind previously unknown in Afghanistan. According to journalist and CNAS member Robert D. Kaplan, while Afghanistan had historically been extremely poor and underdeveloped, it "had never known very much political repression" until 1978. Political scientist Barnett Rubin wrote, "Khalq used mass arrests, torture, and secret executions on a scale Afghanistan had not seen since the time of Abdul Rahman Khan, and probably not even then".

Kaplan states that it was the Saur Revolution and its harsh land reform program, rather than the December 1979 Soviet invasion "as most people in the West suppose", that "ignited" the mujahidin revolt against the Kabul authorities and prompted the refugee exodus to Pakistan. According to scholar Gilles Dorronsoro, it was the violence of the state rather than its reforms that caused the uprisings.

Royal family

Alongside the killing of most of Daoud's family during the coup, other members of the former Barakzai dynasty were jailed. All royal property were seized, members were deprived of Afghan citizenship, and the flow of money to the exiled King Mohammed Zahir Shah and his wife Humaira Begum in Italy were halted.

The Khalqists compiled a list of royal people to be executed after the coup. Prince Ali Abdul Seraj, a great-grandson of the 19th century emir Abdur Rahman Khan, was on the list and managed to flee Afghanistan with his wife and child while disguised as a hippie, joining a bus full of British and Australian hashish smokers.

Legacy

After a few months, the Khalqist regime pushed hard for socialist reforms and was brutal in its repression of opposition, arresting many without charge. The regime alienated a wide variety of people, including tribal and clan leaders, Islamists, Maoists, Western-educated teachers, and traditional religious leaders, all becoming victims of the Khalqists. Discontent fomented amongst the people of Afghanistan, and the first anti-government revolts began in Kunar Province, in October 1978. With regime brutality only increasing, and several uprisings the following year (most notably that in Herat) leaving most provinces in the country under guerilla control, troops from the USSR entered Afghanistan in December, citing the Brezhnev Doctrine as basis for their intervention. Insurgent groups fought Soviet troops and the PDPA government for more than nine years until the final withdrawal of Soviet troops from Afghanistan in 1989. Instability continued in Afghanistan, with war still continuing to plague the entire country for more than four decades after the revolution.

In 1991, PDPA member Babrak Karmal, who headed the Parcham faction and served as president after the invasion, denounced the Saur Revolution:

It was the greatest crime against the people of Afghanistan. Parcham's leaders were against armed actions because the country was not ready for a revolution... I knew that people would not support us if we decided to keep power without such support."

See also

Haqiqat-e Inquilab-e Saur, a newspaper named after the Saur Revolution
Afghanistan-Soviet Union relations

References

External links
Surviving the 1978 Revolution in Afghanistan, a personal account of American Larry Clinton Thompson's experiences in the Saur Revolution
How I escaped from jail in Afghanistan by Ismail Sloan, another personal account of an American who traveled to Afghanistan to rescue assets shortly after the revolution and during Daud Khan's short-lived government

1978 in Afghanistan
Conflicts in 1978
Communism in Afghanistan
Communist revolutions
Democratic Republic of Afghanistan
People's Democratic Party of Afghanistan
1978
Afghanistan
April 1978 events in Asia
20th-century revolutions
Military coups in Afghanistan